Windmill Hill Cutting is a large cutting on the dual gauge railway east of Toodyay in Western Australia. The cutting was constructed between 1963 and 1964 for the Eastern Railway route through the Avon Valley. The route became operational in February 1966.

See also
 Railway cutting

References

Railway cuttings in Australia
Rail infrastructure in Western Australia
Eastern Railway (Western Australia)
Toodyay, Western Australia